The Australian cockroach (Periplaneta australasiae) is a common species of tropical cockroach, with a length of .
It is brown overall, with the tegmina having a conspicuous lateral pale stripe or margin, and the pronotum (head shield) with a sharply contrasting pale or yellow margin. It is very similar in appearance to the American cockroach and may be easily mistaken for it. It is, however, slightly smaller than the American cockroach, and has a yellow margin on the thorax and yellow streaks at its sides near the wing base.

Distribution
Despite its name, the Australian cockroach is a cosmopolitan species, and an introduced species in Australia.  P. australasiae probably originated in Africa. It is very common in the southern United States and in tropical climates, and can be found in many locations throughout the world due to its travels by shipping and commerce between locations.

Habitat
It prefers warmer climates and is not cold-tolerant, but it may be able to survive indoors in colder climates. It does well in moist conditions, but also can tolerate dry conditions as long as water is available. It often lives around the perimeter of buildings. It appears to prefer eating plants more than its relatives do, but can feed on a wide array of organic (including decaying) matter.  Like most cockroaches, it is a scavenger.

It may come indoors to look for food and even to live, but in warm weather, it may move outdoors and enter buildings looking for food. This species can be found in nature in tropical parts of Australia; it has also been found along the east coast of Australia, from Cape York to the Victorian border.

References

External links
 Black and white photographs of top view of P. australasiae male and female specimens, from Smithsonian Miscellaneous Collections.
 Drawings of body parts of a male P. australasiae; plate VII, figures 17-19 show detail of pronotum, end of abdomen with cerci, and enlarged view of the genital process. From a 1917 article by Morgan Hebard, with a key to the figures on pages 280-281.

Cockroaches
Cosmopolitan arthropods
Insects described in 1775